The 2016 Campeonato Mato-Grossense is the 74th season of the Mato Grosso's top professional football league. The competition began on 30 January 2016.

Teams
A total of eleven sides compete in the 2016 season. They were split into two groups, (A and B, 6 sides and 5 sides respectively). The top four sides from both groups will qualify for the second phase. The bottom side in Group A will be relegated to the Campeonato Mat-Grossense (lower levels).

 Araguaia
 Cacerense
 CEOV
 Cuiabá EC
 Dom Bosco
 Luverdense
 Mixto
 Operário Ltda
 Poconé
 Sinop
 União de Rondonópolis

First stage

Group A

Group B

References

Mato Grosso
Campeonato Mato-Grossense